François Meyer (22 October 1933 – 10 June 2022) was a French military officer who achieved the rank of brigadier general.

Biography
The son of an engineer and an officer of the French Air Force, Meyer grew up in Versailles. He studied at the École spéciale militaire de Saint-Cyr and chose to enter the cavalry.

He successfully led two harkis and was first commando chief of the operation sector of Géryville and Boualem. At the end of the war, which resulted in Algeria's independence, 80,000 harkis and their families were massacred by the new government. However, Meyer managed to save 350 people who settled in the Larzac and Sissonne. The harkis who settled here became farmers.

After the war, Meyer worked to maintain the memories of his fellow soldiers in combat, publishing a book in 2005. On 14 April 2012, President Nicolas Sarkozy awarded him the dignity of Grand Officer of the Legion of Honour. On 20 September 2021, President Emmanuel Macron presented him with his insignia as a holder of the Grand Cross of the Legion of Honour at a reception at the Élysée Palace.

François Meyer died in Clamart on 10 June 2022, at the age of 88.

Decorations
 Grand-Cross of the National Order of the Legion of Honour (2020)
 Grand-Officer of the National Order of Merit
 Cross for Military Valour
 Knight of the Ordre des Palmes académiques
 Combatant's Cross
 Medal of the Nation's Gratitude
 North Africa Security and Order Operations Commemorative Medal

Publication
 Pour l'honneur... avec les harkis : De 1958 à nos jours (2005)

References

1933 births
2022 deaths
French generals
École Spéciale Militaire de Saint-Cyr alumni
Grand Croix of the Légion d'honneur
Grand Officers of the Ordre national du Mérite
Chevaliers of the Ordre des Palmes Académiques